Robert Besley (1794–1876) was an English typographer, creator of Clarendon (typeface) in 1845 and the Lord Mayor of London in 1869.

Career
Besley was taken into partnership by William Thorowgood at the Fann Street Foundry in Fann Street, City of London in 1838, having been employed as a traveller there since 1826. He worked with Thorowgood until the latter's retirement in 1849. Thorowgood had been the first to use the term "Grotesque" to describe a Sans-Serif typeface and the first to design one in lower case with Seven Line Grotesque.

When Besley created Clarendon in October 1845 he had it registered under the recently passed Ornamental Designs Act of 1842., but the typeface became so popular that its rights were soon broken by people creating knock-offs, though Clarendon is still known as the first Registered typeface.

Besley retired from the type-founding business in 1861 and went on to become Sheriff of the City of London in 1863 and the Lord Mayor of London in 1869.

References

External links
Image of Besley as Lord Mayor of London
A political cartoon of Besley and fellow members of the Corporation of London

1794 births
1876 deaths
Sheriffs of the City of London
19th-century lord mayors of London
19th-century English politicians
English typographers and type designers